Macrogonaxis is a genus of air-breathing land snails, terrestrial pulmonate gastropod mollusks in the family Streptaxidae.

Distribution 
The distribution of the genus Macrogonaxis includes:
 East Africa
 the Seychelles

Species
Species within the genus Macrogonaxis include:

References

Streptaxidae